Jomås is a village in Froland municipality in Agder county, Norway. The village is located along the Norwegian County Road 152, about half-way between the villages of Heldalsmo and Løvjomås.

References

Villages in Agder
Froland